Michela Cava (born March 26, 1994) is a Canadian ice hockey player, a centre,  playing in the Premier Hockey Federation (PHF) with the Toronto Six.

Playing career
Along with goaltender Danika Ranger, Cava is one of only two players to have won a gold medal at the Esso Cup, Canada’s National Female Midget Championship and the U18 Canadian women’s nationals. Cava was the first, winning the Esso Cup with the Thunder Bay Queens in 2010 and with Team Ontario Red at the 2011 nationals.

NCAA
At the NCAA level, Cava spent her first two seasons with the University of Connecticut Huskies. Prior to her junior season, she transferred to the University of Minnesota Duluth to join the Minnesota Duluth Bulldogs women's ice hockey program. In her final NCAA season, she recorded 38 points in 37 contests, including 12 multi-point games.

Professional 
Cava was selected by the Toronto Furies in the third round of the 2016 CWHL Draft. She made her debut on October 14 against the Boston Blades. Cava recorded a five-game scoring streak, starting on October 30 and lasting until November 20. She was selected to compete in the 2017 CWHL All-Star Game.

After just one year in Toronto, Cava left the league to move to Sweden, signing with Modo Hockey in the SDHL. She would score 55 points in 36 games in her first season in Sweden, leading Modo in points and finishing 5th in the league in scoring. The next year, she would score 64 points, finishing the season as the SDHL's leading scorer.

In 2019, Cava left Modo to sign with Brynäs in Gävle, seeking a new challenge and wanting to move to a bigger city. She would score 45 points in 36 games for Brynäs, finishing fourth in club scoring, as the club advanced to the SDHL semi-finals for the first time in seven years. She would sign with Luleå ahead of the 2020–21 SDHL season.

On October 6, 2021, Cava signed with the Toronto Six of the Premier Hockey Federation.

Career statistics
Sources:

Awards and honours
 2012 Esso Cup MVP
 CWHL First Star of the Game (October 16, 2016)
 CWHL Second Star of the Game (October 30, 2016)
 SDHL Top Point Scorer, 2018–19 season
 SDHL Champion, 2020–21 (Luleå HF/MSSK)
 ZhHL Champion, 2021–22 (KRS Vanke Rays)

References

External links
 
 

1994 births
Living people
Brynäs IF Dam players
Canadian expatriate ice hockey players in Russia
Canadian expatriate ice hockey players in Sweden
Canadian expatriate ice hockey players in the United States
Canadian women's ice hockey centres
Ice hockey people from Ontario
Luleå HF/MSSK players
Minnesota Duluth Bulldogs women's ice hockey players
Modo Hockey Dam players
Sportspeople from Thunder Bay
Shenzhen KRS Vanke Rays players
Toronto Furies players
Toronto Six players
UConn Huskies women's ice hockey players